Muslakh is a rural locality (a selo) in Rutulsky District, Republic of Dagestan, Russia. The population was 612 as of 2010. There are 3 streets.

Geography 
Muslakh is located on the Main Caucasian ridge, between Samur and Kayana Rivers, 42 km northwest of Rutul (the district's administrative centre) by road. Mishlesh and Tsakhur are the nearest rural localities.

Nationalities 
Tsakhur people live in this locality.

Famous residents 
 Yakhya Ferzaliev (Hero of Socialist Labor)

References 

Rural localities in Rutulsky District